The Oak Ridges Moraine Land Trust (ORMLT) is a Canadian charitable non-profit and Land Trust, and has been protecting Ontario's natural legacy since 2,000. Its mission is to ensure a healthy ecosystem and natural environment that thrives forever, on and near the Oak Ridges Moraine.

With the help of caring donors, the ORMLT strategically protects land from development, and stewards it to ensure its ecological features and Species-at-Risk thrive. They typically protect land through land donations or conservation easements.

Since January 2001, the Land Trust has permanently protected 63 properties, totalling over 4,884 acres (19.76 km²) of land, and plays a critical role in solving the global problem of biodiversity loss and climate change.

References
"Oak Ridges Moraine Land Trust Strategic Plan 2018-21"

External links
 Oak Ridges Moraine Land Trust website

Land Trust
Environmental organizations based in Ontario